Liang Huang (梁鍠) (fl. 742–756) was a Tang Dynasty poet who lived during the reign of Emperor Xuanzong of Tang.

Tang dynasty poets
8th-century Chinese poets